Encore is the title of a solo album released in 1995 by Elaine Paige. The album peaked at number 20 on the UK Albums Chart in July 1995.

It is primarily a compilation of material from earlier recordings but also includes three new recordings, all taken from the musical Sunset Boulevard, the London production of which Paige joined the same year. All the tracks are taken from musical theatre.
The album was released on the WEA label and therefore included no material from Paige's RCA recordings, Love Can Do That and Romance & the Stage.

Track listing
 "As If We Never Said Goodbye" - 5:22 (Andrew Lloyd Webber/Don Black/Christopher Hampton/Amy Powers)
 "The Perfect Year"  - 3:31 (Andrew Lloyd Webber/Don Black/Christopher Hampton)
 "Memory" - 4:13 (Andrew Lloyd Webber/T.S. Eliot/Trevor Nunn)
 "I Know Him So Well" - 4:15 (Benny Andersson/Tim Rice/Björn Ulvaeus)
 "Another Suitcase in Another Hall" - 3:27 (Andrew Lloyd Webber/Tim Rice)
 "I Don't Know How to Love Him" - 3:54 (Andrew Lloyd Webber/Tim Rice)
 "On My Own" - 3:48 (Claude-Michel Schönberg/Alain Boublil/Jean-Marc Natel)
 "I Dreamed a Dream" (live) - 4:25 (Claude-Michel Schönberg/Alain Boublil/Jean-Marc Natel)
 "Mon Dieu" - 3:47 (Charles Dumont/Michel Vaucaire)
 "Hymne à l'amour (If You Love Me)" - 2:53 (Marguerite Monnot/Édith Piaf/Geoffrey Parsons)
 "Non, je ne regrette rien" - 3:44 (Charles Dumont/Édith Piaf)
 "With One Look" - 3:19 (Andrew Lloyd Webber/Don Black/Christopher Hampton/Amy Powers)
 "Don't Cry for Me Argentina" (live) - 5:59 (Andrew Lloyd Webber/Tim Rice)

Notes
"As If We Never Said Goodbye", "The Perfect Year" and "With One Look" were all recorded in 1995 for this release. Produced by Andrew Lloyd Webber and Nigel Wright. The recordings were engineered by Robin Sellars and Dave Hunt. The orchestra was conducted by Michael Reed.

"Memory", "Another Suitcase in Another Hall" and "I Don't Know How to Love Him" are taken from Paige's 1983 album Stages produced by Tony Visconti.

"I Know Him So Well" is the 1985 UK No.1 hit that Paige recorded with Barbara Dickson for the concept album Chess, released in 1984. It was also featured on Paige's 1985 solo album Love Hurts.

"On My Own" was a recording produced in 1987 by Tony Visconti for Paige's compilation album Memories: The Best of Elaine Paige.

"I Dreamed a Dream" and "Don't Cry for Me Argentina" are live recordings from a 1993 concert for the BBC at the Birmingham Symphony Hall. They were re-mixed for this release by Nigel Wright.

"Mon Dieu", "Hymne à l'Amour (If You Love Me)" and "Non, Je Ne Regrette Rien" were all taken from the 1994 album Piaf, produced by Mike Moran.

Charts

Certifications and sales

References

1995 compilation albums
Elaine Paige albums
Warner Music Group compilation albums
Albums produced by Andrew Lloyd Webber
Albums produced by Nigel Wright
Albums produced by Tony Visconti